Raciąż  is a town in Płońsk County, Masovian Voivodeship, Poland, with 4,585 inhabitants (2004). Its history dates to 10th century.

History
A Jewish population had lived in Raciąż since the 1600s. Between 1857 and 1931, the Jewish population of the town varied between 35% and 45%, which was typical of small shtetls in the region. At the beginning of World War II, there were about 1700 Jews in Raciąż. The German invaders rounded up most of the Jews and deported them to Warsaw and other larger towns in 1939. Some were sent to labor camps too. Almost all of Raciąż' Jews were murdered during the war, but about ten young survivors returned to town after the war. Most were murdered one night by unknown people, either nationalists or thugs. After that, the remainder left. See Virtual Sztetl.

See also
History of the Jews in Poland
List of shtetls in Poland
Jewish ghettos in German-occupied Poland
List of villages and towns depopulated of Jews during the Holocaust

References

Cities and towns in Masovian Voivodeship
Płońsk County
Shtetls
Holocaust locations in Poland